Paul Harrison may refer to:

Paul Harrison (American football), American football coach
Paul Harrison (Australian footballer) (1944–2005), Australian footballer for South Melbourne
Paul Harrison (English cricketer) (born 1984), English cricketer
Paul Harrison (footballer, born 1984), English footballer
Paul Harrison (ice hockey) (born 1955), retired Canadian ice hockey goaltender
Paul Harrison (Jamaican cricketer) (born 1988), Jamaican cricketer
Paul Harrison (musician) (born 1975), British jazz pianist
Paul Harrison (pantheist), British environmentalist and president of the World Pantheist Movement
Paul Harrison (racing driver) (born 1969), British racing driver
Paul Harrison (weightlifter) (born 1966), Australian Olympic weightlifter
Paul Carter Harrison (1936-2022), American playwright and professor
Paul Phillips Harrison (1882–1950), Canadian politician in the Legislative Assembly of British Columbia